Agrothereutes is a genus of parasitoid wasps belonging to the family Ichneumonidae.

Species
 Agrothereutes abbreviatus
 Agrothereutes adustus
 Agrothereutes albovinctus
 Agrothereutes algericus
 Agrothereutes alutarius
 Agrothereutes aterrimus
 Agrothereutes australis
 Agrothereutes bicolor
 Agrothereutes cimbcivorus
 Agrothereutes ferrieri
 Agrothereutes fumipennis
 Agrothereutes grandis
 Agrothereutes grapholithae
 Agrothereutes hospes
 Agrothereutes lanceolatus
 Agrothereutes leucoproctus
 Agrothereutes leucorhaeus
 Agrothereutes longicauda
 Agrothereutes lophyri
 Agrothereutes macroincubitor
 Agrothereutes mandator
 Agrothereutes mansuetor
 Agrothereutes minousubae
 Agrothereutes montanus
 Agrothereutes monticola
 Agrothereutes neodiprionis
 Agrothereutes pallipennis
 Agrothereutes parvulus
 Agrothereutes pilosus
 Agrothereutes pumilus
 Agrothereutes pygmaeus
 Agrothereutes ramellaris
 Agrothereutes ramuli
 Agrothereutes rufofemoratus
 Agrothereutes saturniae
 Agrothereutes subovalis
 Agrothereutes thoracicus
 Agrothereutes transsylvanicus
 Agrothereutes tunetanus

References
 Catalogue of Life
 Biolib

Cryptinae
Ichneumonidae genera
Taxa named by Arnold Förster